Božidar "Božo" Janković (Serbian Cyrillic: Божидар "Божо" Јанковић; 22 May 1951 – 1 October 1993) was a Yugoslav professional footballer who played as a forward.

Club career
Sometimes also referred to by another nickname Boško, Janković grew up in Sarajevo where he began playing football in FK Željezničar youth system. He signed a professional contract at the age of 17 after passing through every age level at the club, making his First League debut during 1968–69 season. He was the Yugoslav First League joint topscorer in 1970–71 season alongside Hajduk's Petar Nadoveza. Particularly notable during this season was Janković's performance in an away league match versus Red Star Belgrade at Marakana when he scored 4 goals - the game ended 4–1 for Željezničar.

He spent 11 seasons with FK Željezničar (256 league matches, 96 goals) before leaving to join English side Middlesbrough FC in February 1979. He played 42 games in two and a half seasons spent there. He scored 16 goals and he was a club topscorer in 1980–81 season with 12 goals. At the end of the season, he surprised everyone as he decided to end his playing career and start a new one as a lawyer. However, he postponed that decision and signed a contract with FC Metz. This excellent finisher ended his career there, scoring 3 games in 21 matches in all competitions.

International career
Janković made his debut for Yugoslavia in an April 1972 European Championship qualification match against the Soviet Union and earned two caps. His other international appearance was a month later, the reverse game against the Soviet Union in Moscow.

Personal life
He had returned to Sarajevo where he eventually started his law practice. He was also a member of FK Željezničar board. He left the city after the start of War in Bosnia and Herzegovina. In October 1993 he died in Kotor of natural causes at the age of 42.

Honours
Željezničar Sarajevo
Yugoslav First League: 1971–72

Middlesbrough
Kirin Cup: 1980

Individual
Yugoslav First League top scorer: 1970–71

References

External links

1951 births
1993 deaths
Footballers from Sarajevo
Serbs of Bosnia and Herzegovina
Bosnia and Herzegovina footballers
Association football forwards
Yugoslav footballers
Yugoslavia international footballers
FK Željezničar Sarajevo players
Middlesbrough F.C. players
FC Metz players
Yugoslav First League players
Yugoslav Second League players
English Football League players
Ligue 1 players
Yugoslav expatriate footballers
Expatriate footballers in England
Yugoslav expatriate sportspeople in England
Expatriate footballers in France
Yugoslav expatriate sportspeople in France